Howard Alexander Petrie (November 22, 1906 – March 24, 1968) was an American radio, television, and film actor.

Early life

Howard Petrie was born in Beverly, Massachusetts on November 22, 1906. When Howard was three years old his family moved to Concord. The Petries later lived in Arlington and then Somerville, where Petrie received his secondary school education. A talented musician, he conducted his high school glee club and played with various instrumental groups. He was a member of the debating team, a captain in the School Regiment and Chairman of the Senior Night Committee. He appeared in school dramatic productions including a starring role as "Marquis de la Seigliere" in the senior class play and the Jules Sandeau three-act comedy, Mademoiselle de la Seigliere.

Radio career
After he graduated from Somerville High School in 1924, Petrie worked briefly as a bank clerk and a securities salesman. While on a sales call to a radio station, his sonorous bass voice landed him a job. He joined WBZ Radio in Boston in 1929 as a junior announcer. After ten months at the WBZ studios, Petrie left for New York City in June, 1930 where he joined the staff of NBC.

Petrie soon became the head announcer for many of the network's shows. His first major network assignment was on Everything Goes, starring Garry Moore. He was the announcer for scores of shows including Abie's Irish Rose, Big Sister, Camel Caravan, Blondie, The Ray Bolger Show, The Judy Canova Show, The Jimmy Durante Show, and The Garry Moore Show.

In 1936, Petrie won the Batten, Barten and Durstine Award for Good Announcing. In 1942 he was the recipient of the H.P. Davis Memorial Announcers' Award for "personality, adaptability, diction, voice and versatility". He moved to California in 1943 to become the announcer for The Judy Canova Show. As a "personality announcer", he became a character in the show.

Film and television career
In 1947, a movie producer who was looking for a tall man for a character role, saw Petrie on the radio stage and offered him the part. At 6 feet four (193 cm) and 240 pounds (109 kg), Petrie played numerous "big man" roles. He worked as a character actor in over thirty feature films and forty television shows. He often appeared in Westerns in both mediums.

Personal life
On April 21, 1933, Petrie married Alice Wood, whom he met when he worked at NBC, where she was a hostess between 1931 and 1936. She had been an actress. The Petries had one son.

Later years and death
Howard Petrie had been living in semi-retirement at his home, Autumn Hill, in Walpole, New Hampshire, when he died in Keene, New Hampshire, on March 24, 1968. He was interred in Worcester Rural Cemetery, Worcester County, Massachusetts.

Filmography

References
 

Beverly (Mass.) City Directory and North Shore Map. Crowley and Lunt, 1907, 1908, 1909.
Birth record: 1906, Vol. 558, page 407. Massachusetts Vital Records, 1841–1910. From original records held by the Massachusetts Archives. Online database: NewEnglandAncestors.org, New England Historic Genealogical Society, 2004.
Buxton, Frank, and Bill Owen. The Big Broadcast, 1920-1950. New York: Viking Press, 1976.
Dunning, John. Tune in Yesterday: The Ultimate Encyclopedia of Old-Time Radio, 1925-1976. Englewood Cliffs. N.J.: Prentice-Hall, 1976.
Frizzell, Martha McDanolds. A History of Walpole, New Hampshire. Walpole: Walpole Historical Society, 1963, page 263.
Jones, Ken D., Arthur F. McClure and Alfred E. Twomey. Character People, The Stalwarts of the Cinema. Secaucus, N.J.:, 1976, page 163.
"Howard Petrie, 61, A Radio Announcer and Actor, Is Dead." March 26, 1968, New York Times, page 46.
"Obituaries," March 27, 1968, Boston Globe, page 44.
Poindexter, Ray. Golden Throats and Silver Tongues: The Radio Announcers. Conway, Ark: River Road Press, 1978, page 68.
Somerville (Mass.) City Directory. Boston: W.A. Greenough Co., 1924, pages 122, 457.
The Radiator, 1924. Somerville (Mass.) High School Yearbook.
U.S. Census Records, 1910 and 1920, for Beverly and Arlington, Massachusetts.

External links

 
 Photo of 
 Howard Petrie photos Selected images from Howard Petrie's career.
 Howard Petrie at Radioindex.com

1906 births
1968 deaths
People from Beverly, Massachusetts
People from Somerville, Massachusetts
Male actors from Massachusetts
American male film actors
American male radio actors
American male television actors
Male Western (genre) film actors
20th-century American male actors